The 51st Academy of Country Music Awards were held on April 3, 2016, at the MGM Grand in Las Vegas, Nevada. Nominations for the 51st Academy of Country Music Awards were announced on February 1, 2016. Luke Bryan returned to host for his fourth consecutive year, with Dierks Bentley as his cohost for the first time.

Background 
Previously, some categories including Entertainer of the Year, New Male Vocalist of the Year, New Female Vocalist of the Year, and New Duo or Group of the Year were voted directly by fans. Beginning with the 2016 awards show, these became incorporated into a professional membership voting process. Luke Bryan returned to host the show for his fourth consecutive year, with Dierks Bentley as his co-host.

Winners and nominees 
The winners are shown in bold.

Performances

Source:

References

2016 music awards
51
2016 in music
2016 in Nevada
2016 awards in the United States
April 2016 events in the United States
MGM Grand Garden Arena